Salaria Kea O'Reilly (born 13 July 1917 in Milledgeville, Georgia – died 18 May 1990 in Akron, Ohio) was an American nurse and desegregation activist who volunteered in both the Spanish Civil War and the Second World War. During the Spanish Civil War she was the only African American nurse working in the Abraham Lincoln Battalion.

Early life 
Kea was born on 13 July 1917 in Milledgeville, Georgia. Her father was a gardener at the Ohio State Hospital for the Insane in Columbus where he was stabbed to death by a patient when Salaria was a baby. After his death the Kea family moved to Akron. Kea's mother returned to Georgia, leaving Salaria in the care of her three older brothers. Salaria wanted to pursue a career in nursing, but racial segregation policy of the day inhibited this goal in Ohio. She was forced to move on to New York City in 1930, where she graduated the Harlem Hospital School of Nursing in 1934. As a student she managed to end the segregation in the Harlem Hospital's staff dining room and was also able to improve the working conditions of African American nurses. After her graduation Kea stayed in New York and became the head nurse of Seaview Hospital. During her employment at Seaview she became affiliated with the American left. Some reports indicate that she eventually joined the Communist Party USA in 1935,  however Kea herself in later years denied ever having been a member or even having known what Communism was in that time period.

Spanish Civil War 

During the Second Italo-Ethiopian War in 1935 Kea and her fellow nurses started raising money to send medical supplies to Ethiopian troops. She was also anxious to work as a nurse in Ethiopia but the emperor Haile Selassie did not accept foreign volunteers. In 1936 she applied to join the American Red Cross to assist Midwest flood victims, but was rejected because of her ethnicity.

Following the outbreak of the Spanish Civil War in 1936 Kea lectured across the United States to raise funds for the Second Spanish Republic.  During this time Kea developed strong anti-fascist views. Citing the war in Ethiopia as an influence, Kea decided to volunteer to serve in the International Brigades in the Spanish Civil War and joined the American Medical Bureau working with the Abraham Lincoln Battalion in March 1937. A major inspiration for the move was her Catholic faith.

After her arrival in Spain, Kea helped establish a field hospital at Villa Paz near the Spanish capital Madrid. She was captured by the Spanish Nationalist Army but managed to escape with the help of International Brigade soldiers after being held for six weeks. In Villa Paz, Kea met an injured Irish soldier, John O'Reilly, whom she later married. In early 1938, Kea was transferred to different units in Aragon, Lerida and Barcelona and was herself injured in a Nationalist bombing raid. Her wounds were so severe that she was sent back to the United States in May 1938. The same year, Kea wrote her Spanish memoirs While Passing Through. They were published as a pamphlet named Salaria Kea: A Negro Nurse in Republican Spain.

World War II and later years 
In 1940 John O’Reilly was allowed to immigrate the United States. He was soon drafted to serve in the military during World War II. In the beginning of 1944 Kea started working as a volunteer nurse for the United States Army as part of the first group of African American nurses the Army was allowed to recruit. In the United States Kea and O’Reilly experienced strong racism. In Akron they experienced personal threats and property damage, and Kea often referred to her time in the International Brigades as the best days of her life since they were free from discrimination. After the war the O'Reilly family lived in New York, where Kea worked in several hospitals coordinating staff desegregation. In 1973 the couple retired to Akron where Kea died on 18 May 1990.

References

External links
"Salaria Kea: A Negro Nurse in Republican Spain"

1917 births
1990 deaths
Abraham Lincoln Brigade members
Activists for African-American civil rights
African Americans in World War II
African-American Catholics
African-American female military personnel
African-American nurses
American anti-Francoists
American anti-fascists
American nursing administrators
American women nurses
Female United States Army nurses in World War II
Female anti-fascists
People from Milledgeville, Georgia
Women in the Spanish Civil War